John Joseph Malone,  (20 December 1894 – 30 April 1917) was a Canadian flying ace of the Royal Naval Air Service during the First World War. He was credited with 10 aerial victories and received the Distinguished Service Order before dying in combat.

Early life 
John Joseph Malone was born in Inglewood, Ontario, Canada on 20 December 1894; his parents were Mary C. Wallace and Edmund J. Malone. At the time of the younger Malone's enlistment on 11 December 1914, they were residing in Regina, Saskatchewan. Malone gave his occupation as "gas engine mechanic". The medical officer noted that Malone was 5 feet 4 inches tall, with medium complexion, blue eyes, and brown hair. A scar on his hip was described as an identifying mark. A scrawl across the enlistment form seems to indicate that Malone was already "tagged" for flying duty; it reads, "Malone... to learn aviation".

First World War 
Malone learned to fly at the Curtiss Flying School at the Long Branch Aerodrome in Ontario. He earned his Royal Aero Club pilot's certificate on 15 July 1916, and was commissioned as a probationary flight sub-lieutenant in the Royal Naval Air Service the same day. He then shipped out for Britain.

On 1 February 1917, Malone was posted to No. 3 Wing RNAS (later designated No. 3 Naval Squadron RNAS). He scored his first aerial victory on 4 March. After scoring a triple victory followed by a single one, he was an ace. Another triple win followed, bringing his tally to eight.

On 24 April 1917, Malone managed to force a German two-seater to ground for a ninth triumph; Malone's engine then quit, forcing him to land his Sopwith Pup next to his victim. The German observer died of his wounds; his pilot was also wounded. Malone took custody of the pilot while under a barrage of artillery fire. Malone's pilot report states, in part: 

Malone escorted him back to the squadron mess before the German departed into captivity.

Leonard Rochford, a British pilot in Malone's squadron, refers to the incident in some detail in his memoir, I Chose the Sky, published after the war:

A tenth win two days later ended his string. Four days later, on 30 April 1917, Malone was shot down and killed by Paul Billik, beginning the latter's career as an ace. Malone is honored at the Arras Flying Services Memorial.

The award of Malone's Distinguished Service Order was posthumously gazetted on 23 May 1917:

List of aerial victories

See also 
 Aerial victory standards of World War I

Endnotes 

1894 births
1917 deaths
People from Caledon, Ontario
Canadian flying aces
Royal Naval Air Service aviators
Canadian military personnel killed in World War I
Canadian Companions of the Distinguished Service Order
Canadian military personnel from Ontario